Anna Gönczi (born 2 April 1959) is a Hungarian sports shooter. She competed at the 1988 Summer Olympics and the 1992 Summer Olympics.

References

1959 births
Living people
Hungarian female sport shooters
Olympic shooters of Hungary
Shooters at the 1988 Summer Olympics
Shooters at the 1992 Summer Olympics
Sport shooters from Budapest
20th-century Hungarian women